Jan Werle (born 15 January 1984) is a Dutch chess grandmaster.

Junior success
Werle began learning chess at the age of five, after watching his father play with a friend. He progressed rapidly, achieving much success through the various age groups of national and regional championships. He won medals at the European Youth Chess Championships at Kallithea in 2000 and 2001, where he took the bronze in the Under-16 age category and the silver in the Under-18 category, respectively.

Further chess activity
Werle continued to develop quickly over the next few years, by combining a structured coaching regime with frequent tournament practice. He became an International Master in 2001 and a grandmaster in 2006.

Asked about his chess style, he comments that he regards himself primarily as a positional player, but one that can cope well with tactical complications. His fighting spirit has also been a strength, but his opening play was for many years a weakness. Recently, he has worked with Dutch number one Ivan Sokolov to improve the opening phase of his game and with club-mate Sergei Tiviakov, has analyzed some of the games of the old masters, such as Botvinnik, Smyslov and Petrosian. He laments the passing of a time when such creative geniuses could fashion themselves an original playing style; regrettably, the advent of the computer era has, above all else, placed a strong focus on precise analysis.

His tournament record is so far impressive; runner-up at Groningen 2005 and at the Corus 'C' Group (Wijk aan Zee) 2006, winner of the Essent Open 2006 and winner at Lodi in 2007. At Liverpool in 2008, he made only a last-minute decision to enter the EU Individual Open Chess Championship and surprised everyone by winning the event, ahead of many of Europe's leading players, including Michael Adams, Nigel Short, Étienne Bacrot and Maxime Vachier-Lagrave.

Team events
In the German Bundesliga, he was playing for many years for SG Aljechin Solingen, alongside compatriots Daniel Stellwagen, Jan Smeets and Sipke Ernst. In 2015/2016, he joined the Bundesliga team of Werder Bremen.

He also plays league chess in the Netherlands and speaks highly of his experiences in England, where he has represented the Bristol team in the 4NCL.
 
Although he is yet to play for the national team in formal competition, he has been a regular participant of the Howard Staunton Memorial Tournament in London (which occasionally doubles as an informal England vs Netherlands match).

Other interests

Werle has studied law at Groningen University while continuing to improve his chess. He admits that he finds the mental rigours of two such analytical and memory-intensive disciplines extremely demanding and can see the benefits of combining academic study with a more physical sport. His favourite sporting pastimes are football, tennis and rowing.

Regarding the future, his aspirations as a professional chess player are quite modest and he thinks it more likely that his long-term future will be as a practitioner of civil law.

Werle married Romanian chess Woman Grandmaster Iozefina Păuleţ on 7 September 2019.

Notable chess games
Jan Werle v Daniel Fridman - played at the 7th round of the EU championships in Liverpool 2008.
Jan Werle v Peter Wells - played at the Staunton Memorial, London 2008.

References
 Dutch Wikipedia entry
 Chessdom Interview
 Corus 2007 biography
 Jan Werle website homepage

Footnotes

External links

 
 

1984 births
Living people
People from Warnsveld
Chess grandmasters
Dutch chess players
Sportspeople from Gelderland
21st-century Dutch people